Azteca is a strictly Neotropical genus of ants in the subfamily Dolichoderinae. The genus is very diverse and contains around 84 extant species and two fossil species. They are essentially arboreal and many species have mutualistic associations with particular plant species, where the genus Cecropia presents the most conspicuous association. In the Brazilian Amazonia, Azteca species are associated with species of Codonanthopsis.

Species

Azteca adrepens Forel, 1911
Azteca aesopus Forel, 1908
Azteca alfari Emery, 1893
†Azteca alpha Wilson, 1985
Azteca andreae Guerrero, Delabie & Dejean, 2010
Azteca angusticeps Emery, 1893
Azteca aragua Longino, 1991
Azteca aurita Emery, 1893
Azteca australis Wheeler, 1942
Azteca barbifex Forel, 1906
Azteca beltii Emery, 1893
Azteca bequaerti Wheeler & Bequaert, 1929
Azteca brevicornis (Mayr, 1878)
Azteca brevis Forel, 1899
Azteca chartifex Emery, 1896
Azteca christopherseni Forel, 1912
Azteca coeruleipennis Emery, 1893
Azteca constructor Emery, 1896
Azteca cordincola Forel, 1921
Azteca coussapoae Forel, 1904
Azteca crassicornis Emery, 1893
Azteca delpini Emery, 1893
Azteca depilis Emery, 1893
Azteca diabolica Guerrero, Delabie & Dejean, 2010
Azteca duckei Forel, 1906
Azteca duroiae Forel, 1904
Azteca emeryi Forel, 1904
†Azteca eumeces Wilson, 1985
Azteca fasciata Emery, 1893
Azteca flavigaster Longino, 2007
Azteca forelii Emery, 1893
Azteca foveiceps Wheeler, 1921
Azteca gnava Forel, 1906
Azteca godmani Forel, 1899
Azteca goeldii Forel, 1906
Azteca huberi Forel, 1906
Azteca hypophylla Forel, 1899
Azteca iheringi Forel, 1915
Azteca instabilis (Smith, 1862)
Azteca isthmica Wheeler, 1942
Azteca jelskii Emery, 1893
Azteca juruensis Forel, 1904
Azteca lallemandi Forel, 1899
Azteca lanuginosa Emery, 1893
Azteca lattkei Longino, 1991
Azteca laurae Guerrero, Delabie & Dejean, 2010
Azteca linamariae Guerrero, Delabie & Dejean, 2010
Azteca longiceps Emery, 1893
Azteca lucida Forel, 1899
Azteca luederwaldti Forel, 1909
Azteca mayrii Emery, 1893
Azteca merida Longino, 1991
Azteca minor Forel, 1904
Azteca muelleri Emery, 1893
Azteca nanogyna Longino, 2007
Azteca nigra Forel, 1912
Azteca nigricans Forel, 1899
Azteca oecocordia Longino, 2007
Azteca olitrix Forel, 1904
Azteca ovaticeps Forel, 1904
Azteca paraensis Forel, 1904
Azteca petalocephala Longino, 1991
Azteca pilosula Forel, 1899
Azteca pittieri Forel, 1899
Azteca polymorpha Forel, 1899
Azteca quadraticeps Longino, 2007
Azteca salti Wheeler & Darlington, 1930
Azteca sapii Forel, 1912
Azteca schimperi Emery, 1893
Azteca schumannii Emery, 1893
Azteca sericea (Mayr, 1866)
Azteca sericeasur Longino, 2007
Azteca severini Emery, 1896
Azteca snellingi Guerrero, Delabie & Dejean, 2010
Azteca stanleyuli Forel, 1921
Azteca stigmatica Emery, 1896
Azteca subopaca Forel, 1899
Azteca tachigaliae Forel, 1904
Azteca theresiae Forel, 1899
Azteca tonduzi Forel, 1899
Azteca trailii Emery, 1893
Azteca trianguliceps Forel, 1912
Azteca trigona Emery, 1893
Azteca ulei Forel, 1904
Azteca velox Forel, 1899
Azteca xanthochroa (Roger, 1863)

References

External links

 
Ant genera
Dolichoderinae
Hymenoptera of South America
Hymenoptera of North America